María José "Pepa" Bueno Márquez (born 1964) is a Spanish journalist. She was host of the well-known radio show Hoy por hoy in Cadena SER. In 2021, she was appointed as editor-in-chief of El País.

Born in Badajoz, Bueno started her career as news director of the local station of Radio Nacional de España (RNE) in Extremadura and later was transferred to Aragón. She was also editor of Diario 16.

In 1991 Bueno joins Televisión Española to anchor the regional news bulletin in the Territorial Center in Andalucia. Soon she was promoted to the Madrid Territorial Center.

She stayed there for eight years.

In 2004, soon after Fran Llorente was hired as news director of Televisión Española, Bueno was selected to substitute Luis Mariñas in the breakfast interview program Los Desayunos de TVE, work that occupied until 2009. Also between 2007 appeared anchoring the news magazine Informe Semanal and the morning magazine Esta mañana.

In September 2009, Bueno was hired as anchor of the nightly edition of TVE's flagship newscast Telediario after Lorenzo Milá  was named as correspondent to Washington, D.C.

In 2012 Bueno left TVE soon after was hired by Cadena SER to host, along with Gemma Nierga the most listened to radio show in Spain, Hoy por hoy.

In September 2019, she was named host of Hora 25 in Cadena SER

In July 2021, Bueno was appointed as the new editor-in-chief of El País.

References

External links
 

1964 births
Living people
Spanish radio presenters
Spanish women radio presenters
Spanish television presenters
Spanish women television presenters
Spanish television journalists
Spanish women journalists
People from Badajoz
El País editors